Frank Herman Schofield (January 4, 1869 – February 20, 1942) was a decorated admiral in the United States Navy, where he served with distinction in the Spanish–American War and World War I. He was also acting governor of Guam from January 11, 1904, to January 28, 1904.

Military career
Born in Jerusalem, New York, Schofield graduated from the United States Naval Academy on June 6, 1890, and was commissioned ensign in 1892.

Between 1898 and 1917, he served in various capacities afloat and ashore including duty in the Office of the Chief of Naval Operations and a brief position as acting Governor of Guam from January 11, 1904, to January 28, 1904. During this time, while commanding the  he reported seeing "three meteors which he says appeared near the horizon and below the clouds, traveling in a group directly toward the Supply", which has been interpreted by some as an early UFO observation. After American entry into World War I, he was ordered to London, where he served on the staff of Commander, U.S. Naval Forces, European Waters until December 1918. He then assumed duties on the United States Naval Advisory Staff to the Peace Commission in Paris. Awarded the Navy Cross for his World War I and Peace Commission service, he was detached from the Naval Advisory Staff in May 1919 and, in July, returned to sea duty as commanding officer of the battleship, .

During the 1920s, he served on the General Board from 1921 to 1923; was promoted to Rear Admiral in 1924; commanded Destroyer Squadrons, Battle Fleet, from 1924 to 1926; headed the War Plans Division of the Office of the Chief of Naval Operations from 1926 to 1929; was a member of the Naval Advisory Staff, Geneva Conference in 1927; and commanded Battleship Division 4, Battle Fleet in 1929. In 1930, he was commissioned Commander in Chief, Battle Force, with the accompanying rank of admiral; and in 1933, after 47 years of service, he retired. Admiral Schofield died at Bethesda, Maryland, on February 20, 1942. He was buried at Arlington National Cemetery.

References

External links
 
 Frank H. Schofield Letters, 1931-1933 (bulk 1931) MS 21 held by Special Collections & Archives, Nimitz Library at the United States Naval Academy

 

United States Naval Academy alumni
United States Navy admirals
Recipients of the Navy Cross (United States)
American military personnel of the Spanish–American War
United States Navy personnel of World War I
1869 births
1942 deaths
People from Jerusalem, New York
Burials at Arlington National Cemetery
Governors of Guam